MTV Live (formerly known as MTVNHD and MTV Live HD) is the international version of the American TV channel MTV Live as 24-hour high-definition live music pay television network owned by Paramount International Networks' subsidiary Paramount Networks EMEAA. The channel is currently available in International and United States.

Overview
MTV Live, the first ever international high-definition service dedicated to music video, offers a mix of programming from MTV. MTV Live is operated by MTVNI's Emerging Markets group, who produce and broadcast the channel from its Warsaw hub until 22 April 2012 so officially launched new located, new transmitter, new headquarters, new studios, new network, new provider, new content, new media city, new broadcast drive, new transmission, new power, new station, new operation, new corporate and new head office to 17-29 Hawley Crescent NW1 8TT London, United Kingdom was officially opening ceremony on 23 April 2012 as MTV Live HD. The English-language service also features original and acquired shows, and programming from MTVNI's multi-branded library.

The channel's mix of programming includes shows produced by other international MTV production units in Southern Europe, the UK and Latin America. From the beginning the channels' programming schedules were split into two blocks - MTV HD and Nickelodeon HD, but from October through December 2010 the channel only aired music related programs; it restarted airing Nickelodeon shows at the weekends but earlier in the morning. From July 1, 2011, the channel began to focus primarily on live music programming.

History
The channel was launched on 15 September 2008, in some parts of Europe as MTVNHD (MTV-Nickelodeon HD) and in Latin America by the end of 2008. The channel continued to launch in new countries throughout 2010, including Australia where it first became available in standard-definition.

On 1 July 2011, MTVNHD was officially launched new name and logo to becomes MTV Live HD with a new logo to match the new logos of all other MTV channels revealed on the same date. However, in the UK and Ireland the channel remained as MTVNHD. In Australia MTVN Live was rebranded as MTV Live.

On 23 April 2012, MTVNHD was officially launched new name and logo to becomes MTV Live HD in the UK and Ireland along with the launch of a standard-definition MTV Live.

MTV Live HD officially launching ceremony or grand launching based in London on Monday, 23 April 2012 at 00:00:00am GMT with Duke of Cambridge Kate Middleton on same day. At the that time, MTV Live HD was officially opening ceremony or grand opening celebrate on air from icon locations; the Palace of Westminster. At the same time, MTV Live HD officially its version such as MTV Live HD officially opening ceremony its production facilities fully in London, United Kingdom. MTV Live HD was officially launched on the International Version based in London.

On 9 April 2013, MTV Live HD ceased broadcasting in France after to the launch of the HD's versions of the French MTV channels.

On 1 October 2013, MTV Live HD and MTV Live officially launching new the channels logo as part of a global rebrand.

On 3 November 2013, MTV Live and MTV Live HD ceased broadcasting on Foxtel's service in Australia.

On 2 March 2014, MTV Live HD launched on Taiwan CHT MOD. On 24 October that same year, it launched on UPC Romania.

On 5 January 2015, MTV Live HD became encrypted and available only on satellite TV provider OSN in the Arab World, replacing MTV Middle East

On 15 February 2016, the standard-definition MTV Live closed and was replaced by MTV Music +1 in the United Kingdom.

MTV Live officially launching ceremony or grand launching based in New York City on Monday, 1 February 2016 at 00:00:00am ET with Lady Gaga and Beyoncé on same day. At the that time, MTV Live was officially opening ceremony or grand opening celebrate on air from icon locations; the Times Square. At the same time, MTV Live officially its version such as MTV Live officially opening ceremony its production facilities fully in Manhattan, New York City, United States. MTV Live was officially launched on the United States Version based in Manhattan, New York City.

On 29 June 2016, the UK feed of MTV Live HD closed and was replaced with Nick Jr. HD on Sky, and the international feed of MTV Live HD on Virgin Media.

On 29 March 2017, it was launched in Portugal as an exclusive on Meo.

On 5 April 2017, MTV Live HD officially launching new international logo.

On 3 August 2018, it was launched in Brazil as an exclusive on NET.

On 1 February 2021, the Latin American feed, which had a 7-hour delay became simulcast.

From 1 May 2021 until Malaysia Independence Day 2022, MTV Southeast Asia programs are shortened to 8 hour broadcast which is from 4:00pm - 12:00mn (SGT) to giveway for their selected programs from its sister channel MTV Live airing on the channel from 12:00mn – ⁠4:00pm (SGT) daily as MTV Southeast Asia became more of music content with less of entertainment programming.

On 14 September 2021, MTV Live HD was officially renamed MTV Live dropping HD from its branding because due to MTV Live officially continue to all full main high-definition channel officially sign marked international version of the American TV channel MTV Live which owned the American TV channel of the same name in Times Square, Manhattan, New York City.

On 28 April 2022, MTV Live closed in Russia during the program Rock Solid Playlist.

On 1 September 2022, MTV Live officially opening ceremony in Malaysia replacing MTV Southeast Asia marked return for Unifi TV users since the channel stopped on 1 August 2017 and in Hong Kong replacing MTV Southeast Asia.

On 8 September 2022 at 22:00 BST, MTV Live (alongside with MTV Music, MTV Hits, MTV 80s, MTV 90s in the United Kingdom) temporarily suspended its regularly scheduled programming due to the death of Queen Elizabeth II. As a result of the suspension of regular programming on all of MTV's music channels in the United Kingdom (in which MTV Live is broadcasting from) on two music video programs were created in order to fill the gap, one being "Programming Pause" (which it was broadcast from 8 September 2022 at 22:55 until 9 September 2022 at 12:30 BST) and the other being "Nothing but Music" (which it was broadcast from 9 September 2022 at 15:00 BST until 13 September 2022 at 02:00 BST). Both of these programs play laid back and somber music videos. Regular programming for MTV Live were resumed on 13 September 2022 at 02:00 BST starting with the Katy Perry and Nicki Minaj episode of My Life On MTV while regular programming for all of MTV's music channels in the United Kingdom/Ireland were resumed four hours later at 06:00 BST.

On 19 September 2022, all of MTV's music channels in the United Kingdom temporarily suspended its regularly scheduled programming (including teleshopping programs) and it was replaced with the music program "Nothing but Music" (also known "Nothing but Hits" on MTV Hits, "Nothing but 80s" on MTV 80s and "Nothing but 90s" on MTV 90s) on that day due to the state funeral of Queen Elizabeth II.

From 14 December 2022, the broadcasting of MTV Live and affiliated TV channels in Belarus has stopped.

From 8 February 2023, MTV Live officially started airing MTV Top 20 but this is not the same chart as on MTV Hits and MTV.

Availability
The channel is available in thirteen countries throughout Europe and Southeast Asia including:

International

 (studio broadcasting and head office in International)

United States (via United States)
 (studio broadcasting and head office in United States)

Programming

Current Programming
 ... And Friends
 ... vs ... vs ....
 Diary of
 HD Hits!
 Hot Right Now!
 Hot Spot
 Leading Ladies / US Ladies
 Making The Video
 MTV Asks
 MTV Essentials
 MTV Europe Music Awards
 MTV Live
 MTV Movie & TV Awards
 MTV Rewind (2010-2022)
 MTV Unplugged
 MTV Video Music Awards
 MTV World Stage
 Powerplay! This Week's MTV Hotlist
 This Week's MTV Top 20
 Global Beats!
 The Rock Zone!
 MTV Top 20

Shows
 Behind the Music
 CMT Crossroads

Events
 MTV Europe Music Awards
 MTV Movie & TV Awards
 MTV Video Music Awards

On-air identity

See also
 MTV
 MTV Base
 MTV Classic
 Club MTV
 MTV Hits
 MTV Music
 MTV Rocks
 Paramount Networks EMEAA

External links
 MTV Live

References

MTV channels
English-language television stations
Television channels and stations established in 2008
2012 establishments in the United Kingdom
English-language television stations in the United Kingdom
Television channels in the United Kingdom
Music video networks in the United Kingdom
HD-only channels
Music video networks in the United States
English-language television stations in the United States